This is a list of Asian countries by GDP per capita based on purchasing power parity. All figures are given in international dollars and are the latest estimates from the International Monetary Fund. Countries with contiguous boundaries that are partially (but not entirely) located in Asia are shown here in italics, but GDP per capita figures are given for the whole state. Dependent territories (not sovereign states) are not ranked, and are also shown in italics.

List of Asian countries by GDP (PPP) per capita

See also
List of countries by GDP (PPP) per capita 
List of Asian countries by GDP PPP

Notes

References

GDP per capita 
GDP
Asia